Naukot Fort is a fortification that was established by Mir Karam Ali Khan Talpur in 1814. It is situated in Mithi Taluqa, Tharparkar District, approximately 64 km in the south of Mirpur Khas town, Sindh. Its location gave it its other common name, "The Gateway to the Thar Desert". It is meant to guard the area against the Rajputs.

The fort is unique in the area as bricks were only used for its construction and did not use materials such as wood and iron. The fort is developed of burnt bricks in mud mortar which is 113 meters in length and 98 meters in breadth. On the southern side of the castle, another four-sided construction which measures 15 meter × 13 meter has it the merely entrance and narrow approach to the internal placement of fort. The entire walls and bastion reflects attenuating look. The thin narrow entrance is accessed via a twisted passage established by 2 heavy and semi circled bastions. The bastion is near to the gateway, and making a section of the 4-sided squarish establishment, is over 9.5 cm tall with a base of having a diameter about 42 meters.

The altitude of arched entrance is 7 meters and breadth is 4 meters. The access to the internal section of the fort is via causeway kind room and hall, which is the part of 4-sided construction, itself a castle. The fort is composed of 9 semi circled bastions, while the 2 of them are protecting the primary entrance, four at the edges and one each at the center of the southern, northern and western walls. A four-meter-wide wall extends on the four sides of the castle. It owns two burnt-brick stairs to climb the wall upwards, from the internal side of the castle.
The internal portion of the fort consists of the remnants of rooms etc. which might go to recommend that these were the residential luxurious quarters. A minor construction like a prison or dungeon could have been the room of barood khana, or the area to secure ammunition.

Talpurs belongs to the Balochi tribe who later settled in Sindh. The Talpurs dynasty encamped in northern Sindh, spoke the Sindhi language very fluently. Soon their successors and associates established a federation against the dynasty of Kalhora. Although, they enjoy good relation with Kalhoras later then and were offered by them to help arrange the scattered Balochi tribes surviving in Sindh. Talpurs are generally known to be as the founder of Sindh’s Unity. The ruling era of Talpurs in Sindh was from 1783 to 1843. Later, it was captured by the British East India Company commanded by General Charles James Napier.

The building is currently undergoing restorations since its drainage might be blocked, leading to water accumulating within the location.

References

Forts in Sindh
Tharparkar District
Cultural heritage sites in Sindh